Japoon is a national park in Queensland, Australia, 1,306 km northwest of Brisbane.  The park forms part of the Wooroonooran Important Bird Area, identified as such by BirdLife International because it supports populations of a range of bird species endemic to Queensland's Wet Tropics.

See also

 Protected areas of Queensland

References

National parks of Far North Queensland
Protected areas established in 1992
Important Bird Areas of Queensland
1992 establishments in Australia